The Communauté de communes La Brie Nangissienne is a federation of municipalities (communauté de communes) in the Seine-et-Marne département and in the Île-de-France région of France. Its seat is the town Nangis. Its area is 294.1 km2, and its population was 27,809 in 2018.

Composition 
The communauté de communes consists of the following 20 communes:

Aubepierre-Ozouer-le-Repos
Bréau
La Chapelle-Gauthier
La Chapelle-Rablais
Châteaubleau
Clos-Fontaine
La Croix-en-Brie
Fontains
Fontenailles
Gastins
Grandpuits-Bailly-Carrois
Mormant
Nangis
Quiers
Rampillon
Saint-Just-en-Brie
Saint-Ouen-en-Brie
Vanvillé
Verneuil-l'Étang
Vieux-Champagne

See also
Communes of the Seine-et-Marne department

References

Intercommunalities of Seine-et-Marne
Commune communities in France